Šime Gržan (born 6 April 1994) is a Croatian professional footballer who plays for Osijek.

Club career
Gržan went through all the ranks of his hometown club NK Zadar's academy, debuting for the first team shortly after his 17th birthday, on 14 May 2011, coming in the 82nd minute of the home 0-0 draw against GNK Dinamo Zagreb for Luka Begonja. He continued featuring for the first team until the end of 2013. He scored his only goal for Zadar in March 2013, the game winner against NK Lokomotiva, to Begonja's assist.

In the 2013–14 winter transfer period Gržan and teammate Begonja moved together to Lokomotiva. Two years later, Gržan moved on to NK Istra 1961.

After almost of two years playing at Istra, Gržan left the club and signed for Premier League of Bosnia and Herzegovina club HŠK Zrinjski Mostar on 29 December 2017. He won the league title with Zrinjski in the 2017–18 season. He left Zrinjski on 1 February 2019.

The same day that Gržan left Zrinjski, he signed for NK GOŠK Gabela. He made his first appearance for GOŠK on 23 February 2019, in a 1–0 away loss against FK Mladost Doboj Kakanj. He scored his first goal for GOŠK on 24 April 2019, in a 1–2 home loss against FK Radnik Bijeljina. In May 2019, after the end of the season and after the relegation of GOŠK to the First League of FBiH, Gržan decided to leave the club.

On 25 January 2022, Gržan joined Zalaegerszeg in Hungary on loan until the end of the season.

International career
Gržan represented Croatia on various youth levels.

He was part of the Croatia U18 and Croatia U19 teams, featuring in 9 and 6 games respectively for them.

Gržan was also a part of the Croatia U21 team, but didn't feature in any game for them.

Honours

Player

Club
Zrinjski Mostar
Bosnian Premier League: 2017–18

References

External links 

1994 births
Living people
Sportspeople from Zadar
Association football wingers
Croatian footballers
Croatia youth international footballers
NK Zadar players
NK Lokomotiva Zagreb players
NK Istra 1961 players
HŠK Zrinjski Mostar players
NK GOŠK Gabela players
NK Osijek players
Zalaegerszegi TE players
Croatian Football League players
Premier League of Bosnia and Herzegovina players
Nemzeti Bajnokság I players
Croatian expatriate footballers
Expatriate footballers in Bosnia and Herzegovina
Croatian expatriate sportspeople in Bosnia and Herzegovina
Expatriate footballers in Hungary
Croatian expatriate sportspeople in Hungary